Malikarjun  is a former village development committee that is now a Rural Municipality in Darchula District in Sudurpashchim Province of far western Nepal. Mallikarjun is named after the famous temple of lord Shiva Shree Shailyn shikar Malikarjun .  At the time of the 1991 Nepal census it had a population of 1814 people living in 331 individual households.

Media 
To promote local culture Malikarjun has one FM radio station Radio Naya Nepal, 104.5 MHz, a community radio station.

References

External links
UN map of the municipalities of Darchula District

Populated places in Darchula District